The rosette-nosed chameleon (Rhampholeon spinosus) is a small species of chameleon found in virgin forest and woodland of both the eastern and western Usambara Mountains in Tanzania. This endangered species is predominantly ash-grey in colouration, with a distinctive rosette-like nasal appendage.

References

Rhampholeon
Lizards of Africa
Endemic fauna of Tanzania
Reptiles described in 1892
Taxa named by Paul Matschie
Reptiles of Tanzania